Thomas Jefferson Busby (July 26, 1884 – October 18, 1964) was a U.S. Representative from Mississippi.

Born near Short, Mississippi, Busby attended the common schools of his native city, Oakland College, Yale, Mississippi, and Iuka Normal Institute. He then taught in the public schools of Tishomingo, Alcorn, and Chickasaw counties in Mississippi from 1903 to 1908.

He graduated from the Georgie Robertson Christian College in Henderson, Tennessee, in 1905 and from the law department of the University of Mississippi at Oxford in 1909. He was admitted to the bar in 1909 and began practicing at Houston, Mississippi. He served as prosecuting attorney of Chickasaw County from 1912 to 1920.

Busby was elected as a Democrat to the sixty-eighth and to the five succeeding Congresses (March 4, 1923 – January 3, 1935). He was an unsuccessful candidate for renomination in 1934.  He remained in Washington DC practicing law with his son Jeff Busby until 1958. He then returned to Houston, Mississippi where he practiced law until his death there on October 18, 1964. He was interred in Houston Cemetery.

Natchez Trace Parkway 
During his time as a Mississippi congressman, Busby pitched the idea of the Natchez Trace Parkway. His motivation was to create jobs for locals who were suffering from poverty during the Great Depression until other work became available. He also believed that the project would be of interest to the people surrounding the Natchez Trace, and would impact multiple counties along the proposed 450 mile roadway. After its run through Congress and President Franklin D. Roosevelt, the project was given $50,000 to survey the Natchez Trace Trail and evaluate the possibility of Busby's Natchez Trace Parkway.

References

External links 
 
 Jeff Busby Park

1884 births
1964 deaths
University of Mississippi School of Law alumni
Freed–Hardeman University alumni
Democratic Party members of the United States House of Representatives from Mississippi
20th-century American politicians
People from Tishomingo County, Mississippi
People from Houston, Mississippi